Bogdan Bogdanovich Wenig or, in German, Johann Gottlieb Wenig (Russian: Богдан Богданович Вениг; 30 July 1837, in Reval – 1872, in Saint Petersburg) was a Baltic-German painter of historical and religious scenes.

Biography 
His father, Gottlieb (1804–1874), was a music teacher and organist at St. Nicholas Church in Reval. His mother Agathe (1808–1895), an amateur artist, was the aunt of Peter Carl Fabergé. In 1848, he and his family moved to Saint Petersburg, where his father had found employment with the Directorate of the Imperial Theatres. In 1851, he joined his brother Carl at the Imperial Academy of Arts, studying historical painting with Fyodor Bruni.

He was especially noted for his draftsmanship; receiving three small silver medals (1854, 1856, 1857), two large silver medals (1856, 1857), a small gold medal (1859) and, finally, a large gold medal for his sketch depicting the Kiss of Judas (1862).

In 1863, he was one of the artists involved in the "Revolt of the Fourteen"; refusing to participate in the 100th anniversary competition for a large gold medal. From then until 1871, he was a member of the Artel of Artists, led by Ivan Kramskoi.

He graduated from the academy in 1864 with the title of "Artist 2nd Class". In 1865, together with Kramskoi and Nikolay Koshelev, he worked on painting the main dome at the Cathedral of Christ the Savior. During his last years, he worked as a portrait painter. The cause of his early death was apparently not recorded.

References

External links 
 Brief biography @ Yavarda
 Brief biography @ ArtInvestment.ru

1837 births
1872 deaths
Russian painters
Russian portrait painters
Imperial Academy of Arts alumni
Baltic-German people
People from Tallinn